William Sprigg may refer to:

 William Sprigg (judge) (1770–1827), American judge in Ohio, the Orleans Territory and the Illinois Territory
 William Sprigg (pamphleteer), 17th-century English pamphleteer